The Omatako Mountains are two mountains in central Namibia Otjozondjupa Region, located some  north of Okahandja. Their name in the Herero language literally means "buttocks". Omatako Constituency, where the mountains are situated, derives its name from them.

The first European to record the locality was C. J. Andersson in 1851.

Geology 
The uppermost  of each Omatako mountain is made of basalt and dolerite respectively; the darker, more spherical southeastern summit is made of dolerite, while the smooth slopes of the higher northwestern summit are made of basalt.

See also
Breast-shaped hill

References

Mountains of Namibia
Inselbergs of Africa
Otjiherero words and phrases
Otjozondjupa Region